Rose Liechtenstein (26 March 1887 – 22 December 1955) was a German theater and film actress during the silent film era. She was also credited as Rose Lichtenstein.

Life 
Rose Liechtenstein was born in West Prussia in 1887. She received training at the Marie Seebach School before going to Meiningen in 1909 where her career has started. Engagements in Düsseldorf, Mannheim, Berlin and New York followed. Since 1915, Liechtenstein played in theaters in German-occupied territories in Belgium and France. Since 1916 she was also active in film business.

Career 
Among Liechtenstein’s first films should be mentioned “Arme Eva Maria” (1916), “Der eiserne Wille” (1917), “Don Juans letztes Abenteuer” (1918), “Die Japanerin” (1919) and “Das Herz des Casanova” (1919). In the 1920s she appeared in many productions, the most well-known among them are: "Dämmernde Nächte" (1920), "Moral" (1920), "Wie das Mädchen aus der Ackerstrasse die Heimat fand" (1921), "Die Tigerin" (1922). In addition to a number of different types of silent films, Liechtenstein played roles in Fritz Lang’s films “Nibelungen. Part 2” and in “Metropolis”. She also played in his first sound film “M – Eine Stadt sucht ein Mörder”, her last film before emigration.

Besides her stage work, Liechtenstein also made guest appearances on the radio in Berlin in the 1920s. She was the speaker in radio play productions of the “Berliner Funk-Hour”, for example in 1929 in “Straßenmann” by Hermann Kesser, directed by Alfred Braun.

In 1932 the almanac "Künstler am Rundfunk" dedicated a page to Liechtenstein where was written: “Rose Liectenstein was active on numerous stages at home and abroad. She is a frequent guest at the Berliner Funk-Hour. She loves her home and her cats, she has four of them.

As an artist of Jewish descent, she fled Nazi Germany to Palestine in 1933. In 1944 Liechtenstein was a part of the founding team of Teatron Kameri in Tel Aviv. There she developed into “the Israeli’s Adele Sandrock”.

Rose Liechtenstein died in Tel Aviv in 1955 at the age of 68.

Filmography 

 1916: Arme Eva Maria
 1916: Freitag, der 13. Das unheimliche Haus. 2. Teil
 1917: Der eiserne Wille
 1917: Die zweite Frau
 1918: Don Juans letztes Abenteuer
 1919: Dämmernde Nächte
 1919: Das Gebot der Liebe
 1919: Das Geheimnis des Amerika-Docks
 1919: Das Herz des Casanova
 1919: Der Mädchenhirt (by Egon Erwin Kisch)
 1919: Die Bodega von Los Cuerros
 1919: Die Braut des Cowboy
 1919: Die Diamanten des Zaren
 1919: Die Japanerin
 1919: Die Toten kehren wieder. Enoch Arden
 1919: Der Würger der Welt
 1920: Moral
 1920: Seine drei Frauen
 1921: Die rätselhafte Zwölf
 1921: Wie das Mädchen aus der Ackerstraße die Heimat fand. (Das Mädchen aus der Ackerstraße, 3. Teil)
 1922: Die Tigerin
 1922: Der Passagier in der Zwangsjacke
 1922: Im Glutrausch der Sinne. 2. Die geschminkte Frau
 1924: Die Nibelungen
 1927: Metropolis
 1931: M

References

External links 

 

1887 births
1955 deaths
German film actresses
German stage actresses
German silent film actresses
20th-century German actresses
Emigrants from Nazi Germany
Jewish German actresses
20th-century German women